Akmal al-Din al-Babarti, was a Hanafi scholar, jurist, scholastic Maturidi theologian, mufassir (Quranic exegete), muhaddis (Hadith scholar), grammarian (nahawi), an eloquent orator, and prolific author with more than 40 works to his name.

He was praised by several famous scholars, including Ibn Hajar al-'Asqalani, Al-Suyuti, Al-Maqrizi, Ibn Qutlubugha, Ibn Taghribirdi, Ibn al-Hinna'i, Muhammad ibn Iyas, Ibn al-'Imad al-Hanbali, and Abd al-Hayy al-Lucknawi, and the Sultan Barquq was honoring him.

Teachers 
After studying in Aleppo, he moved to Cairo in 740 A.H. (1340 A.D.) where he studied with Shams al-Din al-Isfahani (d. 749/1348), Qawam al-Din al-Kaki (d. 749/1348), Abu Hayyan al-Andalusi (d. 745/1344), Ibn 'Abd al-Hadi (d. 744/1343) and other renowned scholars.

He was appointed as professor in Cairo in the khanqah of the Amir Sayf al-Din Shaykhu/Shaykhun al-Nasiri (also al-'Umari), who was originally a member of the household of Sultan al-Nasir Muhammad b. Kalawun (d. 741/1341).

Students 
Among his celebrated students are Al-Sharif al-Jurjani (d. 1413) and Shams al-Din al-Fanari (d. 1430 or 1431).

Books 
He wrote more than 40 works in Aqidah, Kalam (Islamic theology), Fiqh (Islamic jurisprudence), Usul al-Fiqh (Principles of Islamic jurisprudence), Tafsir (Quranic exegesis), Hadith studies, Islamic inheritance jurisprudence, Nahw (Arabic grammar), Arabic literature, Morphology (linguistics), and Rhetoric.

He wrote commentary on al-Kashshaf. His other works include commentary on Mashariq al-Anwar, commentary on Mukhtasar of Ibn al-Hajib, commentary on Nasir al-Din al-Tusi's Tajrid al-I'tiqad, commentary on al-Hidaya on jurisprudence, commentary on the Alfiyya of Ibn Malik on grammar, commentary on al-Manar, and commentary on al-Bazdawi.

Some of his books are as follows:

 Al-'Inayah Sharh al-Hidayah. This is a commentary on al-Marghinani's book “al Hidayah”.
 Sharh al-'Aqidah al-Tahawiyyah.
 Sharh Wasiyyat al-Imam Abi Hanifa.
 Sharh al-Fiqh al-Akbar by Imam Abu Hanifa.
 Sharh Usul Fakhr al-Islam al-Bazdawi.
 Sharh Mukhtasar Ibn al-Hajib.
 A commentary (Hashiya) on al-Kashshaf by al-Zamakhshari.
 A commentary (Hashiya) on Tajrid al-Kalam by Nasir al-Din al-Tusi.

See also 

 Abu Hanifa
 Abu Mansur al-Maturidi
 'Ala' al-Din al-Bukhari
 Badr al-Din al-Ayni
 Ibn Abidin
 Al-Maydani
 Ali al-Qari
 Shah Waliullah Dehlawi
 Muhammad Zahid al-Kawthari
 List of Hanafis
 List of Ash'aris and Maturidis
 List of Muslim theologians

References

External links
 Who was Shaykh Akmalud Din? – Hadith Answers
 The Traces of the Hanafi Culture from Samarkand to Cairo

Hanafis
Maturidis
14th-century Muslim theologians
Quranic exegesis scholars
Hadith scholars
Sunni imams
Sunni fiqh scholars
Iraqi Sunni Muslim scholars of Islam
Turkish Sunni Muslim scholars of Islam
1310 births
1314 births
1384 deaths
14th-century linguists